The 2004 FIBA Europe Under-18 Championship was an international basketball  competition held in Spain in 2004.

Final ranking

1.  Spain

2.  Turkey

3.  France

4.  Italy

5. 

6.  Russia

7.  Greece

8.  Israel

9.  Lithuania

10.  Bulgaria

11.  Georgia

12.  Latvia

Awards

External links
FIBA Archive

FIBA U18 European Championship
2004–05 in European basketball
2004–05 in Spanish basketball
International youth basketball competitions hosted by Spain